The impact of alcohol on aging is multifaceted. Evidence shows that alcoholism or chronic alcohol consumption can cause both accelerated (or premature) aging – in which symptoms of aging appear earlier than normal – and exaggerated aging, in which the symptoms appear at the appropriate time but in a more exaggerated form. The effects of alcohol use disorder on the aging process include hypertension, cardiac dysrhythmia, cancers, gastrointestinal disorders, neurocognitive deficits, bone loss, and emotional disturbances especially depression. On the other hand, research also shows that drinking moderate amounts of alcohol may protect healthy adults from developing coronary heart disease. The American Heart Association cautions people not to start drinking, if you are not already drinking.

Brain
Alcohol is a potent neurotoxin. The National Institute on Alcohol Abuse and Alcoholism has found, "Alcoholism may accelerate normal aging or cause premature aging of the brain." Another report by the same agency found, "Chronic alcohol consumption, as well as chronic glucocorticoid exposure, can result in premature and/or exaggerated aging." Specifically, alcohol activates the HPA axis, causing glucocorticoid secretion and thus elevating levels of stress hormones in the body. Chronic exposure to these hormones results in an acceleration of the aging process, which is associated with "gradual, but often dramatic, changes over time in almost every physiological system in the human body. Combined, these changes result in decreased efficiency and resiliency of physiological function." Chronic stress and chronic heavy alcohol use cause a similar premature aging effect, including nerve cell degeneration in the hippocampus.

Heart
According to the National Institutes of Health, researchers now understand that drinking moderate amounts of alcohol can protect the hearts of some people from the risks of coronary artery disease.
But, it's not possible to predict in which people alcoholism will become a problem. Given these and other risks, the American Heart Association cautions people not to start drinking.

Life expectancy
A study published in August 2010 in the journal, “Alcoholism: Clinical and Experimental Research,” followed 1,824 participants between the ages of 55 and 65 and found that even after adjusting for all suspected covariates, abstainers and heavy drinkers continued to show increased mortality risks of 51 and 45%, respectively, compared to moderate drinkers. A follow-up study lists several cautions in interpreting the findings. For example, the results do not address nor endorse initiation of drinking among nondrinkers, and persons who have medical conditions which would be worsened by alcohol consumption should not drink alcohol. Additional research suggests that the reasons for alcohol abstinence may be a determining factor in the outcomes for abstainers: those who do not drink because of existing medical conditions or because of previous substance use disorder issues have the highest rates of early death among the abstainers. Other groups of abstainers, such as those who do not drink because of family upbringing or moral/religious reasons, have mortality risks that are as low as those who drink in moderation.

Demographics
Excessive alcohol consumption, especially of distilled alcohol, is responsible for higher mortality rates and lower life expectancy for men in Eastern Europe, especially the former Soviet Union.

See also
 Alcohol dementia

References

 Alcohol and health
Ageing
Senescence